Veľké Straciny is a village and municipality in the Veľký Krtíš District of the Banská Bystrica Region of southern Slovakia. As of 31 December 2004, the municipality has an area of 6 km² and a population density of 24 persons per km².

References

References

External links
 
 

Villages and municipalities in Veľký Krtíš District